Sar Teyuk or Sar-i-Tiuk may refer to either of two villages in Howmeh Rural District in the Central District of Haftgel County, Khuzestan Province, Iran:
 Sar Teyuk-e Olya